Abeïbara Cercle is an administrative subdivision of the Kidal Region of north-eastern Mali. The capital lies at the small town of Abeïbara. The Cercle is divided into Communes, and below this, quarters/villages. As of 2009 the cercle had a population of 10,286.

Communes
The Abeïbara Cercle contains the following Rural Communes:
 Abeïbara
 Boghassa
 Tinzawatene

References

Cercles of Mali
Kidal Region